Ticlatone (trade name Landromil) is an antifungal.

References

Antifungals
Benzothiazoles
Chloroarenes
Lactams
Isothiazolidinones
Benzoisothiazolinones
Preservatives